Lerma station is a proposed Manila Metro Rail Transit (MRT) station situated on Line 8. It will be located in Sampaloc, Manila. If completed, the station will be the western terminus of the line and will be an interchange with Line 1 at Doroteo Jose and Line 2 at Recto via an elevated walkway. 

Close landmarks include the Far Eastern University, Isetann Cinerama Recto, University of the East, Manila City Jail (Old Bilibid Prisons).

References

Manila Metro Rail Transit System stations
Proposed railway stations in the Philippines